Losevo is a rural locality (a station settlement) in Priozersky District, Leningrad Oblast, located at the junction of Vuoksi River and Lake Sukhodolskoye on Karelian Isthmus. It is a railway station of the Saint Petersburg–Khiytola railroad. Before the Winter War and Continuation War, it was a village of the Sakkola municipality of Finland known as Kiviniemi.

In 1857, the channel was dug, but the stream reversed direction, revealed rapids, and rendered navigation impossible.

Before the construction of Saint Petersburg-Khiytola railroad, Kiviniemi was an important river port connected to Antrea (Kamennogorsk), Käkisalmi (Priozersk), and Taipale (Solovyovo). In 1917, the railroad was constructed, and a railway bridge passed over the rapids.

External links
 History of Losevo/Kiviniemi

References 
Rural localities in Leningrad Oblast
Karelia
Karelian Isthmus